Knut Frydenlund (31 March 1927 – 26 February 1987) was a Norwegian diplomat and politician for the Labour Party who served as foreign minister from 1973–1981 and again from 1986–1987. 

Frydenlund was born in Drammen and began his diplomatic career in the 1950s, initially serving at the Norwegian embassy in Bonn, and served in various diplomatic positions during the 1950s and the 1960s. In 1969 he was elected to parliament as a member of the Norwegian Labour Party, and he became foreign minister in the Labour government in 1973. While Labour was out of power from 1981 to 1986, he was replaced as foreign minister by Svenn Thorkild Stray, but returned to the office in May 1986. In February 1987, following his return from a Nordic Council meeting in Helsinki, he collapsed at Oslo's Fornebu Airport due to a cerebral hemorrhage and died soon afterwards at Ullevaal Hospital in Oslo.

References
Associated Press, "Norway's Foreign Minister Dies", February 26, 1987.

1927 births
1987 deaths
Politicians from Drammen
Norwegian diplomats
Foreign Ministers of Norway
Labour Party (Norway) politicians
Members of the Storting
20th-century Norwegian politicians